The Bladensburg Park Pedestrian Bridge is a bicycle and pedestrian bridge over the Anacostia River in the U.S. state of Maryland. The bridge lies between the communities of Colmar Manor and Bladensburg. The bridge was completed in 2005 using a bowstring truss design.

References

Pedestrian bridges in Maryland
Bridges over the Anacostia River
Cyclist bridges in the United States
Bridges in Prince George's County, Maryland